Mouton may refer to:

Mouton, Charente, a commune in France
Mouton, Louisiana, an unincorporated community in the United States
Mouton fur, a sheepskin that has been made to resemble beaver or seal
Mouton de Gruyter, a scholarly publishing house
Château Mouton Rothschild, a Bordeaux wine producer, formerly named simply Mouton

People 
 Alexandre Mouton (1804–1885), United States Senator from, and Governor of, Louisiana
 Alfred Mouton (1829–1864), Confederate general in the American Civil War
 Charles Mouton (1617–before 1699), French baroque lutenist and composer
 Eugène Mouton (1823–1902), French fiction writer, also known as Mérinos
 François Henri Mouton (1804–1876), French and Sikh army officer
 Gabriel Mouton (1618–1694), French scientist who suggested a system of measurement that was the inspiration for the metric system
 Georges Mouton Comte de Lobau (1770–1838), French soldier and political figure, Marshal of France
 Henri Mouton (1869–1935), French scientist known for the Cotton-Mouton effect
 James Mouton (born 1968), American former Major League Baseball player
 Jane Mouton (1930–1987), American specialist in the science and psychology of management
 Jannie Mouton, South African billionaire
 Jean Mouton (c. 1459–1522), French composer of the Renaissance era
 Lyle Mouton (born 1969), American former Major League Baseball player
 Melba Roy Mouton (1929–1990), American NASA scientist
 Michèle Mouton (born 1951), French former rally driver
 Jonas Mouton (born 1988), American former National Football League player

See also
Mutton